Sir Thomas Radcliffe (c.1391-1440), of Astley and Winmarleigh, Lancashire, was an English Member of Parliament.

He was a Member (MP) of the Parliament of England for Lancashire in May 1421, 1423 and 1433.

References

1391 births
1440 deaths
15th-century English people
People from Lewes
Members of the Parliament of England (pre-1707)